Dorchuck Glacier is a narrow glacier, 9 nautical miles (17 km) long, flowing northeast from Jenkins Heights between Klinger Ridge and Ellis Ridge into the Dotson Ice Shelf, on Walgreen Coast, Marie Byrd Land. It was mapped by the United States Geological Survey from surveys and U.S. Navy aerial photographs, 1959–67, and from Landsat imagery, 1972–73. It was named by the Advisory Committee on Antarctic Names after Robert E. Dorchuck, U.S. Navy, a nuclear power plant operator with the Naval Nuclear Power Unit at McMurdo Station, summer and winter seasons, Operation Deep Freeze, 1965 and 1969.

References 

Glaciers of Marie Byrd Land